The Shroud (Maximillian Quincy Coleridge) is a fictional superhero appearing in American comic books published by Marvel Comics.

Publication history

The Shroud first appeared in Super-Villain Team-Up #5 (April 1976) and was created by Steve Englehart and Herb Trimpe.

Englehart has acknowledged that the character was intended as a "mashup" of DC Comics' Batman and The Shadow."As a Marvel writer, I thought I’d never get to write the Batman, so I took some Bat-traits and mixed them with some Shadow-traits so as not to get sued and made my own homage to those dark night characters."

Fictional character biography
At the age of 10, the child who would grow up to become The Shroud saw his parents gunned down right before his eyes. He decided to dedicate his life to fighting crime. Upon graduation from college, he joined the mysterious temple called the "Cult of Kali", where he studied various styles of martial arts. After seven years of intense training, he graduated from that temple. During the celebration ceremony, he was branded with the "Kiss of Kali", a red-hot iron. He had the image of the goddess Kali imprinted in livid scar tissue on his face from nose to hairline and from cheek to cheek. Following a period of intense pain and hospitalization, he realized that his eyesight had been replaced by a mystic extrasensory perception. Traveling back to the United States, he adopted the masked identity of the "Shroud".

In his first appearance as a hero, he encountered the Human Torch. He later invaded Latveria, intending to kill Doctor Doom for his crimes against humanity. Shroud recounted his origin to Namor the Sub-Mariner, and the two secretly entered Latveria disguised as members of the Ringmaster's Circus of Crime. Shroud joined Prince Rudolfo's revolution against Doctor Doom, and came close to his revenge. However, the Shroud shifted gears in order to help Doctor Doom and Captain America oppose someone else with a longer track record of crimes against humanity: the Red Skull. In outer space, Shroud was shot by a ray built by Red Skull while Doctor Doom battled Red Skull on the moon. Shroud was rescued by Captain America, while Red Skull was left defeated on the moon (he was later rescued by Hitler himself as the Hate Monger). Captain America brought Shroud back to Earth, but because of his time in space, Shroud became insane and it took him quite a while to recover. After this recovery, Shroud discovered that he was able to tap into the Darkforce dimension.

The Shroud later recruits Spider-Woman (Jessica Drew) to infiltrate a S.H.I.E.L.D. facility so that they can access the files. Alongside Spider-Woman, the Shroud battled the Cult of Kali. Shroud then took on Cat and Mouse as his aides. He then teamed with Spider-Man against Dansen Macabre. The Shroud aided the Avengers and Doctor Strange against Morgan le Fay. He helped restore the former Spider-Woman's astral self to her body. He later refused Hawkeye's offer to join the West Coast Avengers. Shroud assisted a depowered Jessica Drew against some crooks. He assisted the West Coast Avengers against Graviton and the Blank.

The Shroud went undercover in Los Angeles and by operating as a crime-fighter masquerading as a criminal, he built a reputation as a criminal so he could destroy their world from within. This led him to create the group known as the Night Shift. With the Night Shift, he teamed with Captain America against the Power Broker and his augmented mutates. He tested Moon Knight to see if he could take over as leader of the Night Shift. He refused Taurus's offer to join the new Zodiac. He teamed with Hawkeye against the gang leader, Speedo. Behind the scenes, Shroud made a deal with the West Coast Avengers not to interfere with his activities underground, but during a battle, Shroud went missing and the Night Shift battled the Avengers, causing a strain between the groups when the Shroud stopped the battle. When Shroud returned to action, it was revealed that he had spent some time with his family, though no actual names of that family have ever been revealed. Shroud made few appearances in the years following.

When the Superhero Registration Act was proposed by the United States during the Civil War storyline, Shroud refused to accept the proposal to give up his secret identity, and sided against heroes such as Ms. Marvel and Iron Man. He is also in a romantic relationship with Julia Carpenter (now known as Arachne). With Julia's help, Shroud managed to escape from Ryker's Island, injuring a number of S.H.I.E.L.D. agents in the process. The two of them planned to flee to Canada with Rachel (Julia's daughter), but Wonder Man and Ms. Marvel captured Shroud, and Julia the following issue. He is then broken out, in order to join Captain America's anti-registration army and takes part in the final battle.

During the Shadowland storyline, Shroud is paired with Silver Sable, Misty Knight, and Paladin when Daredevil's Hand ninjas target members of the mafia.

Powers and abilities
Exposure to bombardment of the Red Skull's hypno-ray triggered a latent power over darkness in the Shroud. Shroud possesses the mystical ability to create an aperture into Darkforce Dimension and to project the thick, inky gas-like substance of the Darkforce Dimension into Earth's dimension for his own use. This darkness is not simply the absence of light, but the negation of it. No illumination can penetrate it. It is unknown how much of this darkness Shroud can summon at once. He can blanket a small auditorium in darkness within several seconds. The darkness he projects does not fill a volume instantly: it is possible to see its hazy boundary move like thick, black smoke in the air. There appears to be no limit to the length of time Shroud can maintain the darkness. However, loss of concentration can disrupt his power to summon and control darkness, and if Shroud is rendered unconscious the darkness seems to be naturally drawn through the portal from which it came.

The Shroud has control over the darkness so as to create hazy-edged, featureless black shapes with it, the complexity of which is limited only by his imagination. For example, he once created two discs that covered Captain America's eyes, preventing him from seeing anything or becoming hypnotized, yet so small that they were indistinguishable from the pupils of his eyes. He frequently forms the darkness into his own shadow in order to serve as a decoy. Unlike Darkstar's Darkforce, the darkness possesses no mass, and unlike Cloak, Shroud is unable to travel into and out of the dimension from which he draws his darkness. He eventually learned to give his darkness enough mass to serve as a low-level thruster. Together, with the properties of his cape, this allows him to fly at least at walking speed.

The Shroud was blinded in a mystic ceremony by the Cult of Kali. As a result of this ceremony, he possesses a mystical sense of extrasensory perception enabling him to "see" through walls and even through his own mantle of darkness. Not unlike Daredevil, Shroud can receive non-visual sensory impressions through solid objects. Thus, he can perceive people and objects in the room next to him with the ease that he can perceive the contents of the room he is in. His mystic senses can even enable him to detect the internal hardware components of a computer.

The Shroud is an Olympic-level athlete with extensive training in several fields of East Asian martial arts, and is adept at acrobatics and infiltration. He possesses a college degree in law and criminology. Shroud carries explosive "bombarangs" as weapons, and flies in a personal one-man aircraft.

Other versions

Ultimate Marvel
An Ultimate Marvel equivalent of Shroud is a superhero who is a supporting character, wearing a red shroud to obscure the face. Writer Brian Michael Bendis notes "We'll be teasing this person. You won't know if they're male or female but it is someone very famous and we'll be revealing their identity in the first arc... This [depiction] is very different from the Marvel Universe one. [This version of the character] is someone you've seen. They're a survivor of Ultimatum who for some reason feels they can't show their face anymore."; the character is eventually revealed to be Kitty Pryde.

In other media
Shroud appears in Lego Marvel Super Heroes 2. He appears in the "Cloak and Dagger" DLC.

References

External links
Marvel Universe: The Shroud
Comics That Time Forgot: The Shroud
Adherents.com: Religion of The Shroud

Characters created by Herb Trimpe
Characters created by Steve Englehart
Comics characters introduced in 1976
Fictional blind characters
Fictional businesspeople
Fictional characters who can manipulate darkness or shadows
Fictional characters with superhuman senses
Marvel Comics martial artists
Marvel Comics superheroes
Vigilante characters in comics